Nattaphol Sukchai (born 10 September 1992) is a Thai professional footballer who plays as a full back for Thai League 1 club Police Tero.

References

External links
 
 at Soccerway

1992 births
Living people
Nattaphol Sukchai
Nattaphol Sukchai
Nattaphol Sukchai
Nattaphol Sukchai
Association football defenders